Dakrupe Mosque is a mosque built in the Sudanese architectural style in the village of Dakrupe in Savannah Region, Ghana. It was named after the neighborhood the mosque is. It is close to the Larabanga mosque. The village is located between Bole and Larabanga.

History 
It is claimed the mosque was built in the 19th century.

Features 
The Dakrupe mosque is similar to the Larabanga mosque but smaller in size.

References 

Mosques in Ghana
19th-century mosques
Savannah Region (Ghana)
Sudano-Sahelian architecture